The  is an arts museum located in Tokyo Midtown, Roppongi, Tokyo. It is owned by the Suntory corporation. The collection theme of the art works is "Art in life" and they mainly have Japanese antiques.

History 
In 1961, Suntory President Keizo Saji opened the Suntory Museum in the Palace Building in Marunouchi, Chiyoda, Tokyo with the theme of "Art in life". In 1975, it was moved to Suntory Building in Akasaka, Minato, Tokyo. When the Tokyo branch of Suntory was to move to Odaiba in January 2005, the museum was temporarily closed. On March 30, 2007, the former site of the Defense Agency was redeveloped and reopened as a new "Suntory Museum of Art" to be moved into the "Tokyo Midtown". It was temporarily closed in November 2019, renovated, and reopened in July 2020. As a result, the ceiling was made more earthquake-resistant, the indoor lighting was changed to LED, and the entrance, shops and cafes adjacent to the building, and staff uniforms were renewed. The design of the renewal was supervised by Kengo Kuma, who designed the Tokyo Midtown Garden Site, where the museum is located, and the museum. The Suntory Museum of Art, Mori Art Museum and The National Art Center, Tokyo, comprise the "Roppongi Art Triangle"

Gallery

References

External links 
 
Suntory Museum of Art within Google Arts & Culture

Kengo Kuma buildings
Akasaka, Tokyo
Art museums and galleries in Tokyo
Suntory
Buildings and structures in Minato, Tokyo